John Plender is a British financial journalist.

John Plender is with the Financial Times where he has been a columnist and a senior editorial writer since 1981.  He is also a broadcaster on current affairs for Channel 4 and the BBC. Earlier in his career he was with The Economist.

In 1992 he broke the story of the Church of England's investment losses.

Books
 That’s The Way The Money Goes,  with Andre Deutsch, (1982)
  The Square Mile, with Paul Wallace, (Hutchinson, 1984)
  A Stake in the Future,  with Nicholas Brealey, 1997) 
 Going Off The Rails - Global Capital and the Crisis of Legitimacy,  with John Wiley (2003) 
 Ethics and Public Finance with Avinash Persaud, (Longtail, 2007)
 Capitalism: Money, Morals, and Markets,(Biteback, 2015)

References

Year of birth missing (living people)
Living people
British male journalists
Financial Times people